The 2013 African Youth Athletics Championships were the first edition of the biennial athletics competition for African athletes aged fifteen to seventeen. It was held in Warri, Nigeria, on 28–31 March. A total of 40 events were originally scheduled but only 36 went ahead, 17 for boys and 19 for girls.

The Warri Township Stadium in Nigeria's Delta State, underwent significant renovation for the competition. The stadium was expanded to accommodate an international standard track and field and the installation of a Timetronics EDM (Electronic Distance Measurement) system was the first of its kind in the country. Emmanuel Uduaghan, the Delta State Governor, urged further use of the stadium for national and international events, as well as underlining the importance of good facilities to assist future generations of Nigerian athletes to attain an elite standard.

The girls' pole vault competition was cancelled as there were only two entrants and the walk events were rescheduled to take place as road, instead of track, events. The South African delegation was absent due to a lack of funds to attend to the event. The boys' hammer throw, 400 metres hurdles and pole vault were not contested despite some entries.

Nigeria topped the medals table with twelve gold medals and 33 medals overall (after doping disqualifications). The next most successful countries were Egypt (eight golds and 16 in total) and Ethiopia (26 medals, seven of them gold). Kenya placed fourth with five golds and eleven medals. Sixteen nations reached the medal table. Egyptian discus thrower Amira Khaled Mohammed was the first ever gold medallist of the championships. Nigeria was dominant in the sprint events, while Egypt performed best in the throwing events.

Divine Oduduru and Adewunmi Deborah Adewale of Nigeria completed 100/200 metres sprint doubles in the boys' and girls' sections, respectively. Kenyan Robert Biwott claimed both boys' middle-distance titles. His teammates Edwin Melly and Daisy Jepkemei achieved the same feat of winning the steeplechase and being runner-up in the 3000 metres. Egypt had the top two places in the boys' shot put and discus events as Mohamed Magdi Hamza and Sherif Adel Salem Ahmed gained a gold and a silver each. Uruemu Theophilus Ejovi won an unusual medal combination by taking bronze in the high jump and triple jump disciplines.

Several athletes at the competition went on to win medals at the 2013 World Youth Championships in Athletics held that July. Biwott won the world 1500 m youth title, Hamza was a shot put bronze medallist and Daisy Jepkemei won the world youth steeplechase silver medal.

Medal summary

Boys

Girls

Medal table

Doping notes
 Cecilia Francis, the women's 100 m silver medallist and medley relay gold medallist for Nigeria (alongside Adewunmi Deborah Adewale, Edidiong Ofonime Odiong and Abimbola Junaid), was tested for drugs at the competition and gave a positive for anabolic steroids. Her results at the event were annulled per IAAF rules and she was banned for one year. The case also resulted in a lifetime ban for her coach Abass Rauf, who took the athlete to a doctor for an injection but refused to tell Francis what the substance was. A four-year ban was also given for 1968 Olympic champion Lee Evans, who was acting as her consultant at the time.
 As a result of the above incident, in the women's 100 metres Togo's Prenam Pesse was upgraded to second place and Ethiopia's Suraj Neima Sefa moved up to third place. In the medley relay, the silver and bronze medallists, Ethiopia and Zimbabwe, were promoted to gold and silver medal positions, respectively. Morocco was upgraded from fourth to third in the medley relay. In the medal table, Togo and Zimbabwe moved up from joint 14th to joint 8th.

References

Results
31/03/2013 Full results of the 1st African Youth Championships. Confederation of African Athletics (2013-03-31). Retrieved on 2013-09-14.

External links
Official website

African Youth Athletics Championships
African Youth Athletics Championships
International athletics competitions hosted by Nigeria
African Youth Athletics Championships
African Youth Athletics Championships
Warri
2013 in youth sport
March 2013 sports events in Nigeria